House Rules may refer to:
 House rules, rules applying only in a certain location or organization
 House Rules (novel), a novel by Jodi Picoult
 House Rules (1998 TV series), an American sitcom
 House Rules (2003 TV series), an American television show hosted by Mark L. Walberg
 House Rules (Australian TV series), an Australian competitive renovation game show which debuted in 2013
 House Rules (mixtape), a mixtape by Slaughterhouse
House Rules (NCIS), NCIS season 12 episode 10